Pamela Ravenscroft, known as Pamela Swynford De Beaufort  is a Fictional character from the television series True Blood by Alan Ball (screenwriter) based on The Southern Vampire Mysteries by author Charlaine Harris. Portrayed by Actress Kristin Bauer van Straten Pam is a vampire created by Eric Northman and the co-owner of Fangtasia, a vampire bar. Her age is not mentioned in True Blood. However, in the short story "Two Blondes," it is later revealed that she is approximately 160 years old.

Backstory
Little is known about Pam's human life in the book series until the seventh novel, All Together Dead, in which she tells Sookie Stackhouse that she had lived in London with her parents during the Victorian era. As a human, Pam was romantic and bold. At the age of 19, while traveling at night to see a friend's cousin with whom she had a romantic relationship, she encountered vampire Eric Northman, who changed her into a vampire.

Her human history was edited for the 5th season of the television series, making her a madam in a Barbary Coast (San Francisco) brothel in 1905.  However, a reference to her life and family in England was made in the season 5 finale episode.

Physical description

Harris describes Pam as looking as a young, middle-class, suburban housewife, but mostly like "Alice in Wonderland with fangs".  She is round-faced with a chalky pale complexion, dark blue eyes, and straight blond hair "white as a magnolia petal". She is also described as shorter than Sookie, who is 5 feet 6 inches tall. In an internal monologue, Sookie describes her as "ethereally lovely, with a kind of deadly edge."

Personality and traits
Much of Pam's character is revealed through her morbid humor, which has a sweet-but-lethal charm. Despite the fact that humor is a rare quality in a vampire, Pam believes that vampires are superior to humans. She frankly states that she was quite happy to be turned into a vampire, feeling that she would have quickly grown into a frustrated, bitter and ultimately cruel person, due to her limited life options as a human woman of her time (although it can be argued that she did the same as a vampire).  She is portrayed as a callous, amoral, and self-centered individual.  She takes joy in teasing and provoking others, such as Fellowship of the Sun members Sookie, Felicia, and especially Eric. When Sookie first enters Fangtasia, she reveals that she "never forgets a face." Later in the HBO series, Jessica calls Pam and is told, "Yes, I remember you perfectly." Since Sookie entered Fangtasia, though, Pam has found ammunition to tease Eric—ammunition that used to be difficult to find.  Like Eric, Pam has a violent, vengeful nature, although she often expresses her wit through dry humor. Pam speaks with an American accent but slips into a slightly old English accent when excited. Like her maker, she is lethal in combat and supremely confident in her ability to overcome most foes and survive most attacks, even from other supernaturals.

Relationships
In the book series, Pam is portrayed as bisexual and is more fond of women. In From Dead to Worse she dated Amelia Broadway, Sookie's roommate and a witch.

Pam can often be seen beside Eric, whom she is bound to obey. She is also in love with Eric and has been since she first met him, and she is very concerned about Eric's happiness and well-being. She is friends with Sookie, whom she sometimes calls her "telepathic friend" and her "favorite breather" and who has rescued her twice, first during the battle with the witches in Dead to the World and then in All Together Dead from a collapsing hotel. Pam advised Sookie to be more selective in picking her friends in reference to Arlene. It was revealed in Dead to the World that she shared a nest with Clancy and Chow.

Work and position within the vampire hierarchy
Harris introduces Pam as the co-owner of Fangtasia and Eric's second-in-command.  Later in the books, it is revealed that Eric asked Pam to leave Minnesota and move to Louisiana to help him run the vampire bar. Pam is based at the bar as a bouncer and co-owner but has other duties in Eric's various business dealings. Pam's leadership skills take the forefront in the fourth book, Dead to the World, when Eric has memory loss.

After Eric marries Freyda, the Queen of Oklahoma, in Dead Ever After, Pam becomes the new vampire sheriff of area 5 in Louisiana.

Television portrayal
In True Blood, the HBO television series based on the books, Pam (renamed Pamela Swynford De Beaufort) is portrayed by Kristin Bauer van Straten, who first appeared in a BloodCopy.com video called “The Vampire in Baton Rouge”. In the True Blood series, Bill mentions that she was turned 100 years ago during the old west period. Pam is also shown speaking Swedish occasionally. She's a strong and hard character who's sarcastic, cruel, and callous and feels little for virtually anyone but Eric. However, she puts aside her own feelings towards Sookie in Season 4, when Eric loses his memory, and she asks Sookie to look after him. The fifth season episode, "Authority Always Wins" has flashbacks showing Pam as the madam of a brothel in 1905. Eric saved her from a man who had wished to kill her.  In this storyline, Eric only turned Pam, who feared the life of an old ex-prostitute, after she threatened suicide. At the end of True Blood she and Eric are getting rich from New Blood, the cure for "Hep V", and are happily living with each other again.

References

Fictional vampires
Fictional bisexual females
Fictional characters with superhuman durability or invulnerability
Fictional characters with superhuman strength
Fictional characters who can move at superhuman speeds
Fictional characters with accelerated healing
Fictional people from London
Fictional prostitutes
Literary characters introduced in 2001
The Southern Vampire Mysteries characters